The seagrass eel or Suenson's worm eel, Chilorhinus suensonii, is an eel in the family Chlopsidae. It was described by Christian Frederik Lütken in 1852. It is a tropical, marine eel which is known from the western Atlantic Ocean, including Bermuda, southern Florida, USA; and Bahia, Brazil. It inhabits reefs, beds of seagrass (from which its common name is derived), and sandy regions. Males can reach a maximum total length of 18 cm.

These eels feed primarily on benthic invertebrates and finfish.

References

Chlopsidae
Fish described in 1852